Clausius is a lunar impact crater that is located in the southwest part of the Moon, in the small lunar mare designated Lacus Excellentiae. It is completely enclosed by mare material, although the tiny satellite crater Clausius A lies just to the north. The rim of Clausius is low and sharp, with a slightly oval shape that is longer in the north–south direction. The interior floor has been flooded by basaltic lava, and appears level and featureless with a darker surface that matches the mare surface that surrounds the crater exterior.

It´s named after  German physicist and mathematician Rudolf Clausius.

Satellite craters
By convention these features are identified on lunar maps by placing the letter on the side of the crater midpoint that is closest to Clausius.

External links
 LAC-110, lunar chart from Gazetteer of Planetary Nomenclature

References

 
 
 
 
 
 
 
 
 
 
 
 

Impact craters on the Moon